Mihály Gáber (– September 13, 1815) was a Slovene Roman Catholic priest, a writer, and the best friend of Miklós Küzmics. Küzmics standardized Prekmurje Slovene with Gáber's help.

Gáber was born in Dolnji Slaveči and became friends with Küzmics in his childhood. He was ordained a priest in 1777 in Szombathely. In September and December that year he served as an administrator in Pertoča, and in 1778 and 1779 he was a curate in Gornji Petrovci. He served as the parish priest of Martjanci until his death.

Gáber assisted Küzmics's literary efforts. Küzmics wrote the first Catholic books in the Prekmurje dialect and tried to use less foreign (primarily Kajkavian) words. Through Gáber, many elements from the dialect used in the Parish of Martjanci were transferred to the standard language. János Szily, the Bishop of Szombathely, encouraged the pair to translate the Bible.

Gáber also wrote some Catholic hymns in the Prekmurje dialect.

See also 
 List of Slovene writers and poets in Hungary

Literature 
 Géfin Gyula: A szombathelyi egyházmegye története III. (1935)
 Jožef Smej: Martjanska župnija v perspektivi 600 let.

Slovenian writers and poets in Hungary
19th-century Slovenian Roman Catholic priests
1750s births
1815 deaths
People from the Municipality of Grad
18th-century Slovenian Roman Catholic priests